Lieutenant-Colonel Lord Charles FitzRoy (28 February 1791 – 17 June 1865), was a British soldier and Whig politician. He fought at the Battle of Waterloo at an early age and later held political office as Vice-Chamberlain of the Household between 1835 and 1838.

Background
Fitzroy was the second son of George FitzRoy, 4th Duke of Grafton, and his wife Lady Charlotte Maria Waldegrave, daughter of James Waldegrave, 2nd Earl Waldegrave. Henry FitzRoy, 5th Duke of Grafton, was his elder brother.

Military career
He joined the British Army in 1807 and fought in the 1809 Battle of Corunna early in the Peninsular War, before joining the Walcheren Expedition the same year. He subsequently joined Lord Hill's staff in the Peninsular and was present at the Siege and capture of Badajoz (1812) and the 1813-14 battles of Vittoria, Pyrenees, Nivelle, the Nive, Orthes and Toulouse serving as a Deputy Assistant Adjutant General (DAAG).

At Waterloo in 1815 he served on Wellington's as a captain in the 1st Foot Guards and an Assistant Adjutant General (AAG). He then served on Wellington's staff in the army of occupation in Paris after Waterloo. His portrait was painted by Edouard Pingret (who also painted a very similar portrait of Col Dawson Kelly CB) in 1818 wearing the Waterloo medal on his AAG uniform. He retired from the army on half pay as a major and brevet lieutenant-colonel of the 27th Regiment of Foot in 1821.

In retirement, he was chairman of the Finance Committee and honorary member of the 43rd Middlesex Rifle Volunteers.

Political career
FitzRoy was elected as a Member of Parliament (MP) for Thetford at the 1818 general election, and held the seat until the 1830 general election, which he did not contest. He returned to Commons the following year, when he was elected at the 1831 general election as MP for Bury St Edmunds. He held the seat until 1847, when he did not stand again. When the Whigs came to power under Lord Melbourne in 1835, FitzRoy was sworn of the Privy Council and appointed Vice-Chamberlain of the Household, a post he held until 1838.

Family

Fitzroy married Lady Anne Cavendish, daughter of George Cavendish, 1st Earl of Burlington and Lady Elizabeth Compton, on 25 October 1825. They had two sons and two daughters. He died on 17 June 1865 at Hampton, aged 74. Lady Charles FitzRoy died in May 1871, aged 83.

References

External links 
 

1791 births
1865 deaths
Younger sons of dukes
Whig (British political party) MPs for English constituencies
Members of the Parliament of the United Kingdom for English constituencies
UK MPs 1818–1820
UK MPs 1820–1826
UK MPs 1826–1830
UK MPs 1831–1832
UK MPs 1832–1835
UK MPs 1835–1837
UK MPs 1837–1841
UK MPs 1841–1847
Members of the Privy Council of the United Kingdom
Charles